Ramaria strasseri is a species of coral fungus in the family Gomphaceae. First described by Giacomo Bresadola in 1900 as Clavaria strasseri, it was transferred to the genus Ramaria in 1950 by E.J.H. Corner.

References

Gomphaceae
Fungi described in 1900
Taxa named by Giacomo Bresadola